is a Japanese politician who was Prime Minister of Japan from 2011 to 2012. He was a member of the Democratic Party, and a member of the House of Representatives (lower house) in the Diet (national legislature). He was named to succeed Naoto Kan as a result of a runoff vote against Banri Kaieda in his party, and was formally appointed by the Emperor on 2 September 2011.

Following a severe loss for the DPJ in the December 2012 general election, Noda conceded defeat and announced his resignation as party leader. He was succeeded by Shinzō Abe as Prime Minister on 26 December 2012.

Early life
Noda was born in Funabashi on 20 May 1957, the son of a paratrooper in the Japan Self-Defense Forces.  Unlike many prominent Japanese politicians, Noda has no family connections to Nagatachō. His parents were too poor to pay for a wedding reception.

Noda graduated from Chiba Prefectural Funabashi Senior High School in 1975. He graduated from Waseda University with the B.A. degree in Political Science in 1980 and was later accepted into the prestigious Matsushita Institute. This institution was founded by Kōnosuke Matsushita (the founder of Panasonic) to groom future civic leaders of Japan. While attending the Matsushita Institute, Noda read household gas meters as a part-time job in his native Chiba Prefecture, partially in order to get to know his future constituents better in preparation for a run for office.  He was first elected to the assembly of Chiba Prefecture in 1987 at the age of 29.

Diet career

In 1993, he was elected to the Diet for first time representing Chiba's Lower House District #4 as a member of the now-defunct Japan New Party. He later joined the DPJ and served as its Diet affairs chief as well as head of the party's public relations office.

In October 2005, Noda criticized Prime Minister Jun'ichirō Koizumi for his position on Japanese class A war criminals as "war criminals". However, Noda supported Koizumi's visit to Yasukuni Shrine.

Noda acted as senior vice finance minister when the DPJ won control of the Diet in September 2009, and was appointed as Minister of Finance by Prime Minister Naoto Kan in June 2010. He was known as a reformist and had led a DPJ intraparty group critical of ex-DPJ powerbroker Ichirō Ozawa. Upon assuming the post of finance minister, Noda, a fiscal conservative, expressed his determination to slash Japan's deficit and rein in gross public debt. In January 2011, for the first time in six years, the finance ministry intervened in the foreign exchange market and spent 2.13 trillion yen to purchase dollars in order to rein in the yen's spiraling appreciation.

Prime Minister

After Naoto Kan's resignation in August 2011, Noda stood as a candidate in the party election to replace him. He won a runoff vote against Banri Kaieda in the leadership election, making him the presumptive prime minister. He inherited the challenge of rebuilding from the 2011 Tōhoku earthquake and tsunami.

During the party caucus making the leadership decision, Noda made a 15-minute speech in which he summarized his political career by comparing himself to dojo loach, a kind of bottom-feeding fish. Paraphrasing a poem by Mitsuo Aida, he said, "I'll never be a goldfish in a scarlet robe, but like a loach in muddy waters. I'll work hard for the people, to move politics forward." The "loach speech" was popular among his colleagues and cemented his political reputation at the start of his term.

Noda was said to have close relations with the United States, and stressed the importance of the US-Japan security alliance in an August 2011 speech. On 15 August 2011 —the anniversary of the Surrender of Japan in World War II, he said that Japan's class A war criminals convicted by the Allies were not legally war criminals under his view. As prime minister he stated that his position on this issue would follow the standard set by previous administrations, and that he did not wish to alter Japan's close relationship with China and Korea.

Nuclear policy
In his first speech as Prime Minister on 2 September 2011, Noda confirmed that the Japanese government would continue to phase out nuclear power, by not building new nuclear power plants nor extending the life spans of outdated ones. In May 2012, nuclear power plants which were sitting idle in the wake of the Fukushima disaster were restarted in order to help Japan's immediate demands for energy, despite protests including hundreds of people.

Trans-Pacific Partnership
After becoming Prime Minister, one of Noda's most important initiatives was pursuing the entry of Japan into the negotiations for the Trans-Pacific Partnership, which he announced on 11 November 2011. This proved controversial and was widely discussed in Japanese society.

Senkaku Islands
The Tokyo Metropolitan Government under Governor Shintaro Ishihara sought to buy the Senkaku Islands, which are claimed by China and Taiwan. Ishihara wished to build facilities on the islands to more obviously claim them as Japanese territory, a move which the national government under Noda regarded as likely to exacerbate tensions with China. On 27 April 2012 the Tokyo government began raising funds from the public to purchase the islands. and by September 2012 1.4 billion yen ($17.8 million) had been raised.

On 24 August, Noda went on live television and vowed to appeal to the international community to support Japan's claims to sovereignty over islands at the center of separate disputes with South Korea and China. On 11 September, the Japanese government nationalized its control over Minami-kojima, Kita-kojima, and Uotsuri islands by purchasing them from the Kurihara family for ¥2.05 billion.  China's Foreign Ministry objected saying Beijing would not "sit back and watch its territorial sovereignty violated."

Consumption tax increase
Another major priority of Noda's was his effort to increase Japan's consumption tax from 5% to 10%. During this struggle Noda said that he "staked his political life" on the passage of the law. The bill passed through the lower house of the diet on 26 June 2012, and passed the upper house on 10 August 2012. On 10 August 2012, Noda survived a no-confidence vote after proposing a five-percent increase in the sales tax. During negotiations for the tax, Noda promised to call an early election "soon". Afterwards, he stated that he had planned to quit as a lawmaker if he had been unable to pass the consumption tax increase.

Noda received praise for passing the consumption tax hike despite intense opposition, but was also criticized for bringing the DPJ closer in substance to its rival LDP, rather than keeping the campaign promises by which it defeated the LDP in 2009. One commentator called him "the best prime minister the LDP never had."

2012 general election

On 21 September 2012, Noda won the DPJ's leadership bi-annual election by 818 points out of 1,231. He then said: "I would like to beef up our teamwork so that we can shift the DPJ once again to make it a fighting force that can serve Japan. [I promise to] sweat with all of you to make a vigorous Japan together. The real reform Japan needs is decisive politics when we face issues that need to be decided." His result was seen as more certain after Environment Minister Goshi Hosono stepped back from standing in the election. He defeated former agriculture ministers Michihiko Kano and Hirotaka Akamatsu, as well as former internal affairs minister Kazuhiro Haraguchi.

On 14 November 2012, Noda stated that the diet would be dissolved on 16 November 2012, and the election would be held on 16 December 2012. Given the DPJ's poor figures in the polls, many members of the DPJ were opposed to this, including General Secretary Azuma Koshiishi, and there was talk among some DPJ members of trying to oust Noda before the next election.

The DPJ managed to narrow its polling gap with the LDP prior to the start of the election campaign in December, raising hopes that the DPJ could prevent the LDP from obtaining an outright majority and force a coalition government to be formed. In the wake of the brutal battle surrounding the consumption tax increase, Noda revived the Trans-Pacific Partnership as a campaign issue, making market liberalization the focal point of his campaign strategy.

In the election, held on 16 December, the LDP enjoyed a resounding victory under the leadership of Shinzō Abe, winning an outright majority while the DPJ lost around three-fourths of its seats. Noda immediately announced his resignation as president of the DPJ in order to take responsibility for the defeat.

Personal life
Noda has been married to his wife Hitomi since 1992 and has two sons. He has a black belt in judo. His favorite food and drink are ramen and sake. He wrote a book entitled Enemy of the DPJ: Government Change Has a Good Cause.

In an interview with The Washington Post Noda said he loved watching movies and is a fan of Meryl Streep, who had recently won an Academy Award for her portrayal of the former British prime minister Margaret Thatcher in The Iron Lady. The movie follows Thatcher's life and career as she pushed through a series of economic and administrative reforms despite opposition from her countrymen. Noda also said one of his favorite movies is the 1939 film Mr. Smith Goes to Washington, which tells the story of a U.S. senator who single-handedly fights against political corruption.

Noda is a fan of professional wrestling and has stated that Kenta Kobashi is his favorite wrestler. On 11 May 2013, Noda attended Kobashi's retirement event, Final Burning in Budokan, in Tokyo's Nippon Budokan.

See also
Noda Cabinet

References

External links

|-

|-

|-

1957 births
Living people
21st-century prime ministers of Japan
People from Funabashi
Waseda University alumni
Democratic Party of Japan politicians
Government ministers of Japan
Japan New Party politicians
Liberalism in Japan
Members of the Chiba Prefectural Assembly
Members of the House of Representatives from Chiba Prefecture
Ministers of Finance of Japan
Noda cabinet
People from Tokyo
Prime Ministers of Japan
21st-century Japanese politicians
Politicians from Chiba Prefecture
Yoshihiko Noda